A herald, or a herald of arms, is an officer of arms, ranking between pursuivant and king of arms. The title is commonly applied more broadly to all officers of arms.

Heralds were originally messengers sent by monarchs or noblemen to convey messages or proclamations—in this sense being the predecessors of modern diplomats. In the Hundred Years' War, French heralds challenged King Henry V to fight. During the Battle of Agincourt, the English herald and the French herald, Montjoie, watched the battle together from a nearby hill; both agreed that the English were the victors, and Montjoie provided King Henry V, who thus earned the right to name the battle, with the name of the nearby castle.

Like other officers of arms, a herald would often wear a surcoat, called a tabard, decorated with the coat of arms of his master. It was possibly due to their role in managing the tournaments of the Late Middle Ages that heralds came to be associated with the regulation of the knights' coats of arms. Heralds have been employed by kings and large landowners, principally as messengers and ambassadors. Heralds were required to organise, announce and referee the contestants at a tournament. This practice of heraldry became increasingly important and further regulated over the years, and in several countries around the world it is still overseen by heralds. In the United Kingdom heralds are still called upon at times to read proclamations publicly; for which they still wear tabards emblazoned with the royal coat of arms. 

There are active official heralds today in several countries, including the United Kingdom, the Republic of Ireland, Canada, and the Republic of South Africa. In England and Scotland most heralds are full-time employees of the sovereign and are called "Heralds of Arms in Ordinary". Temporary appointments can be made of "Heralds of Arms Extraordinary". These are often appointed for a specific major state occasions, such as a coronation. The Canadian Heraldic Authority has created the position of "Herald of Arms Emeritus" with which to honor long-serving or distinguished heraldists. In Scotland, some Scottish clan chiefs, the heads of great noble houses, still appoint private officers of arms to handle cases of heraldic or genealogical importance of clan members, although these are usually pursuivants.

In addition, many orders of chivalry have heralds attached to them. These heralds may have some heraldic duties but are more often merely ceremonial in nature. Heralds which were primarily ceremonial in nature, especially after the decline of chivalry, were also appointed in various nations for specific events such as a coronation as additions to the pageantry of these occasions. In the Netherlands, heralds are appointed for the Dutch monarch's inauguration where they wore their tabards until 1948; these heralds proclaim the inauguration ceremony to have been completed to those inside and outside the Nieuwe Kerk.

English Heralds

English Heralds of Arms in Ordinary
Richmond Herald of Arms in Ordinary
Chester Herald of Arms in Ordinary
Lancaster Herald of Arms in Ordinary
York Herald of Arms in Ordinary
Somerset Herald of Arms in Ordinary
Windsor Herald of Arms in Ordinary

English Heralds of Arms Extraordinary
Arundel Herald of Arms Extraordinary
Beaumont Herald of Arms Extraordinary
Maltravers Herald of Arms Extraordinary
New Zealand Herald of Arms Extraordinary
Norfolk Herald of Arms Extraordinary
Surrey Herald of Arms Extraordinary
Wales Herald of Arms Extraordinary

Scottish Heralds

Scottish Heralds of Arms in Ordinary
Albany Herald of Arms in Ordinary
Marchmont Herald of Arms in Ordinary
Rothesay Herald of Arms in Ordinary
Snawdoun Herald of Arms in Ordinary

Scottish Heralds of Arms Extraordinary

Angus Herald of Arms Extraordinary
Islay Herald of Arms in Extraordinary
Orkney Herald of Arms Extraordinary
Ross Herald of Arms Extraordinary

Canadian Heralds

Canadian Heralds of Arms In Ordinary
Chief Herald of Canada
Assiniboine Herald of Arms in Ordinary
Athabaska Herald of Arms in Ordinary
Coppermine Herald of Arms in Ordinary
Fraser Herald of Arms in Ordinary
Miramichi Herald of Arms in Ordinary
Saguenay Herald of Arms in Ordinary
Saint-Laurent Herald of Arms in Ordinary

Canadian Heralds of Arms Extraordinary
Albion Herald of Arms Extraordinary
Capilano Herald of Arms Extraordinary
Cowichan Herald of Arms Extraordinary
Dauphin Herald of Arms Extraordinary
Niagara Herald of Arms Extraordinary
Rouge Herald of Arms Extraordinary

Canadian Heralds of Arms Emeritus
Outaouais Herald of Arms Emeritus
Rideau Herald of Arms Emeritus

Indian Empire Herald of Arms Extraordinary
Delhi Herald of Arms Extraordinary

See also
 The Court of the Lord Lyon
 Town crier

Notes

References

External links

The Court of the Lord Lyon
The College of Arms
The Canadian Heraldic Authority
The Office of the Chief Herald of Ireland
Genealogy & Heraldry Bill, 2006 Introduced in the Irish Senate to provide a sound legislative basis for Ireland's heraldic authority.

Heraldry
Legal professions